Noise from the Basement is the debut album by Canadian singer-songwriter Skye Sweetnam, released on September 21, 2004 by Capitol Records. It debuted and peaked at number 124 on the Billboard 200 and number 15 on the Oricon Album Charts.

Development and recording 
Originally planned for a late 2003 release, the release of Sweetnam's debut album was postponed several times by the record label, being pushed back to April, then May and finally August of the following year before its official release in September of that year.

Music and lyrics 
Noise From The Basement was subject to many comparisons among critics with Avril Lavigne due to their similarities – same nationality and resembling attitude although Skye has described herself as being more "girly-girl" than she and mentioned that after hearing both albums, she could not find any real similarities between their sound, describing her album as "Avril lite," "bubblegum Britney" and "manufactured skate punk".

Promotion
Three songs from Noise from the Basement were released as singles. "Billy S." was released as the lead single, followed by "Tangled Up In Me" and "Number One". "Superstar" was released as a standalone track on iTunes.

Prior to the release of her debut album, Sweetnam toured in summer camps in the American Camplified Tour, from July to August 2003. In September, she performed in some venues in Ontario, New Brunswick, Nova Scotia and Newfoundland. She was also the opening act for Britney Spears' Onyx Hotel Tour and performed in the United States, Canada and Europe in the Spring of 2004. About that experience, she said:

"I love catching people off guard. That's why opening for Britney was so great. I was playing for people who had no idea who I was and had never heard my music. And by the end of the set, a lot of them found themselves really getting into it."

Skye was supposed to continue opening for Britney in the Summer, when the tour was going to return for a second round of concerts, but the Onyx Hotel Tour was eventually cancelled due to Spears injuring her knee. Following cancellation, Sweetnam regretted that it could no longer be used to promote Noise from the Basement, stating:

"It was kind of disappointing (when Britney hurt her knee) because we had this whole media hype behind the tour. It would have worked really well for a lead up for my album." 

On August 5, 2004, she performed in the Fourth Annual Pantene Pro-Voice Concert, in New York City. Starting that month, she was a featured artist on AOL breakers for two months, and was also featured in a series of magazines, namely Rolling Stone, Blender, Teen People and Teen Vogue. Further promotion was backed up by a live performance of "Tangled Up In Me" in The Tonight Show with Jay Leno, one day before album's final release, and Sessions@AOL live performances a week earlier that same month.

In November 2004, Sweetnam went on tour with Ryan Cabrera and praised the positive reception from the audience in both Cabrera and Spears tours, mentioning she was fortunate to open for artists with different musical styles. Earlier that year, the track "Imaginary Superstar" was featured in Sleepover soundtrack and a shorter version of "Number One" was used in Women's National Basketball Association television commercials. This version had different lyrics from the album version, being recorded exclusively for the campaign.

Track listing

Personnel 
 Skye Sweetnam – vocals
 James Robertson – various instruments
 Jeremy Wheatley – programming, background vocals
 Tim Van Der Kuil – guitar
 Damon Wilson – drums
 Andrew Martino – drums
 Vincent Sciara – keyboards

Chart positions

Release history

References

Skye Sweetnam albums
2004 debut albums
Capitol Records albums
Teen pop albums